Wyoming Highway 411 (WYO 411), also known as Millburne Road, is a  state highway in central Uinta County, Wyoming, United States, that connects the unincorporated community of Millburne with Wyoming Highway 410 (WYO 411), southwest of Mountain View.

Route description
WYO 411 begins at the eastern end of Uinta County Road 260 (CR 260) in southern Millburne, just west of Blacks Fork. (CR 260 heads southwesterly to connect with Uinta County Road 261 before ending at a ranch house.) From its western terminus, WYO 411 heads north for about  before connecting with the west end of Main Street. Shortly thereafter WYO 411 turns to head east. In the middle of its curve, WYO 411 has a junction with Uinta County Road 217 (CR 217) at a T intersection. (CR 217 heads north, past the Millburne Cemetery, then east to end at Uinta County Road 219 [CR 219] on the southeast corner of the Fort Bridger Cemetery.) After connecting with the north end of Mill Avenue and crossing Blacks Fork, WYO 411 continues east for about  before briefly turning southeast. Along this short southeast section, WYO 411 connects with the south end of CR 219 at T intersection, crosses the Blacks Fork Canal (also known as Lyman Canal), and then connects with the north end of Uinta County Road 263 (CR 263), at another T intersection. (CR 219 head north to Fort Bridger and CR 263 heads south to Robertson.) WYO 411 then curves again to resume its eastern course. (WYO 410 heads north, then east to end at Wyoming Highway 414 in Mountain View and south to end at a county road west of Robertson.) For its length, WYO 411 is a two-lane road.

History

Major intersections

See also

 List of state highways in Wyoming

References

External links

 Wyoming State Routes 400-499
 WYO 411 - WYO 411 to Millburne

Transportation in Uinta County, Wyoming
411